The fourth season of the American serial drama television series Friday Night Lights commenced airing in the United States and Canada on October 28, 2009. It was the second season to be aired on DirecTV's The 101 Network. The 13-episode season concluded on The 101 Network on February 10, 2010 and then began its run on NBC on May 7, 2010, which concluded on August 6, 2010. The fourth season was released on DVD in region 1 on August 10, 2010.

The season focuses on the reopened East Dillon High School and the East Dillon Lions football team.

Cast

Main cast
 Kyle Chandler as Eric Taylor
 Connie Britton as Tami Taylor
 Taylor Kitsch as Tim Riggins
 Jesse Plemons as Landry Clarke
 Aimee Teegarden as Julie Taylor
 Michael B. Jordan as Vince Howard
 Jurnee Smollett as Jess Merriweather
 Matt Lauria as Luke Cafferty

Recurring cast
 Zach Gilford as Matt Saracen
 Brad Leland as Buddy Garrity
 Madison Burge as Becky Sproles
 Alicia Witt as Cheryl Sproles 
 Jeremy Sumpter as J.D. McCoy
 Derek Phillips as Billy Riggins
Louanne Stephens as Lorraine Saracen
 Kim Dickens as Shelby Saracen
 Stacey Oristano as Mindy Collette
Blue Deckert as Mac McGill
 Steve Harris as Virgil Merriweather
 Dana Wheeler-Nicholson as Angela Collette
Angela Rawna as Regina Howard
 Minka Kelly as Lyla Garrity
 D.W. Moffett as Joe McCoy

Season synopsis
Coach Taylor works to establish a football program at the poorly-funded East Dillon High School. Most of the players have not played football before, adding to the difficulties. Landry Clarke ends up in the boundaries of East Dillon and plays football there, eventually becoming the kicker of the team. Vince Howard, a troubled teen, is brought onto the team by Coach Taylor and eventually becomes quarterback. Both Landry and Vince compete for the attention of the same girl, Jess Merriweather. Jess's father is a former East Dillon player that Coach Taylor tries to get more involved in the program, along with other former East Dillon players. The new star Panthers player Luke Cafferty is transferred to East Dillon after it is revealed he does not live in Dillon High boundaries. Tim Riggins quits college and moves back to Dillon to work with his brother Billy in their car repair shop. Billy and his new wife Mindy don't let him live in their home, so Tim moves out into a trailer. The trailer is on the property of a woman Tim slept with previously, and while living there he befriends her daughter Becky Sproles. Becky has a crush on him, but he treats her more like a sister. Tami Taylor continues to navigate politics as the principal of Dillon High as she becomes unpopular by the transfer of Luke to East Dillon and when she is wrongly accused of telling a student to get an abortion. Matt Saracen goes to Dillon Tech, but eventually moves to Chicago, much to the dismay of his girlfriend, Julie Taylor. Julie is now a senior in High School, and decided to attend East Dillon to set an example that there is nothing wrong with the school. J.D. McCoy becomes heavily arrogant, and bullying (unlike the shy, and strait-laced teammate he was the previous season). The season charts the uphill battle of the East Dillon Lions football team, ultimately culminating in a win against rival Dillon High School which keeps the Dillon Panthers out of the year’s playoffs.

Fictional game results

 At the beginning of season five of Friday Night Lights, it is revealed that the East Dillon Lions' record during the season represented above was two wins and eight losses. Thus, three games (all losses) were not included in episodes. Public high schools in Texas typically play a ten game regular season.
 Down 45–0, the Lions forfeited the game at halftime due to injuries.
 Down 27–0, the Lions score a touchdown. It's not shown if the extra point was converted.
 The Lions are down 7–0 at one point. The final score was not shown.
 Landry Clarke kicks the game-winning field goal to beat the Panthers, and the Panthers therefore do not make the playoffs.

Episodes

Reception

Critical response
On Rotten Tomatoes, the season has an approval rating of 100% with an average score of 9 out of 10 based on 26 reviews. The website's critical consensus reads, "In its penultimate season, Friday Night Lights continues the raw, heartfelt drama fans expect while adding a few fresh narrative twists." On the review aggregator website Metacritic, the fourth season scored 88 out of 100, based on 18 reviews, indicating "Universal acclaim". Matthew Gilbert of The Boston Globe wrote "the NBC series certainly has been one of TV's most emotionally honest and stirring works, and it remains so as it enters its fourth season." Verne Gay of Newsday praised several elements, calling it "quirky, funny, smart" and has "wonderful acting". Matt Roush of TV Guide lauded the series' authenticity, saying "you can't help but get emotionally involved in the lives of these instantly recognizable and compelling characters." Kris King of Slant Magazine praised the series, despite the change of setting and characters, saying, "On a whole, the new season of Friday Night Lights manages to retain its depth and heart-wrenching warmth despite a sea change in its structure and characters."

Accolades
For the 62nd Primetime Emmy Awards, Kyle Chandler and Connie Britton received their first nominations for Outstanding Lead Actor in a Drama Series and Outstanding Lead Actress in a Drama Series, respectively. Rolin Jones was nominated for Outstanding Writing for a Drama Series for the episode "The Son", and the series received its fourth consecutive nomination for Outstanding Casting for a Drama Series.

References

External links
 Friday Night Lights – list of episodes at NBC
 

 
2009 American television seasons
2010 American television seasons